Thomas Mikaele (born 11 January 1998) is a New Zealand rugby league footballer who plays as a  for the Warrington Wolves in the English Super League.

He previously played for the Wests Tigers in the National Rugby League.

Background
Mikaele was born in Auckland, New Zealand, and is of Samoan descent.

He grew up in Ipswich, Queensland and played his junior rugby league for the Goodna Eagles. From 2015 to 2016, while attending Keebra Park State High School, he was selected twice for the Australian Schoolboys.

Playing career
In 2014, Mikaele played for the Ipswich Jets in the Cyril Connell Cup, before moving up to their Mal Meninga Cup team in 2015. In 2015, he was selected in the Queensland under-18 team, scoring a try in their 22–18 win over New South Wales. In 2016, he again represented the Queensland under-18 team, starting at prop in a loss to New South Wales.

In 2017, Mikaele joined the Wests Tigers, playing for their NRL Under-20s and Jersey Flegg Cup sides.

2019
In Round 1 of the 2019 NRL season, Mikaele made his NRL debut against the Manly-Warringah Sea Eagles at Leichhardt Oval. He made 23 appearances over the course of the season, only missing one game in first grade, and re-signed with the Tigers until the end of the 2021 season. Starting the season from the bench, he finished playing in the starting team at prop. He was one of the competition's leaders in attracting defenders, with 4 needed for 65% of his attacking runs.

At season's end, Mikaele was diagnosed with keratoconus. He said, "I couldn't see about 15 metres in front of me so a ball coming to me was hard to catch at times or something happening further up the field. I didn't realise I had eye problems beyond just needing glasses. I started having a lot of handling errors from last year and then over the off-season. I noticed at training I couldn't see as far even with my contacts in."

2020
Mikaele played 18 games for Wests in the 2020 NRL season.  The club missed the finals by finishing 11th on the table.

2021
Mikaele played a total of 19 games for the Wests Tigers in the 2021 NRL season as the club finished a disappointing 13th and missed the finals.

2022
On 23 May, he was granted an immediate release from his Wests Tigers contract to join English side Warrington on a two and a half year deal.

References

External links
Tigers profile

1998 births
Living people
New Zealand rugby league players
New Zealand sportspeople of Samoan descent
Rugby league players from Auckland
Rugby league props
Warrington Wolves players
Wests Tigers players
Western Suburbs Magpies NSW Cup players